The Green Party of Florida is the state affiliate of the Green Party of the United States in Florida.

History
The Green Party of Florida was organized in 1992. At that time the State of Florida had a very stringent standard applied to what were considered minor party candidates in elections. To have statewide ballot status, minor parties had to file a petition with at least 3% of all registered voters. To keep this status, they had to maintain a number of party members equal to 5% of all registered voters.

In 1998 state law concerning access to the state ballot was eased. In February 1999 the state legislature implemented changes allowing any party organized on a state basis to field candidates in elections. This allowed the Green Party and other parties to qualify to field candidates on the ballot. The Green Party has retained its statewide ballot status ever since.

The Florida Green Party has opposed the presence of nuclear power plants in Florida. In fact, the party intervened in the licensing process of the proposed Levy County Nuclear Power Plant, which has yet to be built.

In April 2010 the Florida Green Party and the People's Lobby Coalition for Public Funding Only of All Elections held a public forum at the National Press Club in Washington, DC. The purpose of the forum was to press for only public funding of elections.

Registration

Organization
The state organization has 2 co-chairs, a treasurer and a secretary. It has a number of committees. These include the Electoral Committee, the Bylaws Committee, the Fund-Raising Committee, the Media Committee, the Outreach Committee and the IT (information technology) Committee. The Electoral Committee helps persons wanting to become candidates and also asks potential candidates about their political views.

The Green Party has ten chapters, which usually are county chapters. The state organization constantly seeks to organize new local chapters.

The Florida Green Party is listed as an endorser organization of the Move to Amend. This organization, in its own words, is "dedicated to ending the illegitimate legal doctrines that prevent the American people from governing themselves."

Public officials
Past and present public officials from the Green Party include:

Eric Fricker, City Commission, Cocoa Beach Seat 3 (Brevard County) (2000-2004)
Dan McCrea, City Commission, South Miami (Miami-Dade County) (2003) 
Nadine Burns, City Council, Lake Worth District 3 (Palm Beach County) (2003-2006)
Kim O'Connor, Soil & Water District Commissioner, Ochlockonee River District 3 (2004–2006) (Leon County) Soil & Water District Commissioner, District 2 (2016-) (Hillsborough County) 
John Baron, Community Commission, Aventura (Miami-Dade County) (2004) 
Cara Jennings, City Commission, Palm Beach District 2 (Lake Worth) (2006–2010)
Anita Stewart, Hillsborough County Soil & Water Conservation Board, Seat 5 (2010–)

Currently Running:

Robin Harris, Florida State House of Representatives, District 41 (2022)

Presidential nominee results
Since 1996, the Green Party has run a candidate for President of the United States. The candidate who has received the most votes in Florida was Ralph Nader in 2000.

See also
 Politics of Florida
 Government of Florida
 Elections in Florida
 Political party strength in Florida
 Law of Florida
 List of politics by U.S. state

References

External links
 
 

 
Florida
Political parties in Florida
Political parties established in 1992
1992 in Florida
1992 establishments in Florida
State and local socialist parties in the United States